Monty Python's Flying Circus is the first album produced by the Monty Python troupe, released in both the UK and US in 1970, with the US version featuring a back cover slightly different from the original UK version. It features newly recorded versions of sketches from the first Monty Python's Flying Circus television series.

Next to the television show itself, the album was the first piece of media the Pythons released. It is noted that Terry Gilliam was not included as a member of Python on the album's cast listing (in spite of his brief appearance in the sketch "The Visitors") and Graham Chapman's name is misspelled "Grahame".

The album was recorded on a single day, 2 May 1970, in front of a live audience at the Camden Theatre in London. Recalling the rather muted response, Eric Idle would later claim "they were a particularly dead audience."

The copyright to the record is still owned by the BBC, making it one of the few pieces of material the Pythons themselves do not own. This is also the reason why it did not gain a 2006 special edition release. One of the tracks makes specific mention to the album being in stereo, and Chapman demonstrates it by walking from one speaker to another. The effect was totally lost as the album was recorded in mono, which the Pythons did not know at the time. They felt disenchanted by the BBC's album producing methods, and for their remaining albums sought very different approaches.

Audiobook
The album has been available on CD as an audiobook since 1996. (It was first released as an audiobook in 1994 on cassette.)

In 2011, AudioGO Ltd. released a "Facsimile Edition," which is the only audiobook version with the original LP's artwork.  Graham Chapman's name is spelled correctly on the cover of this edition.

In 2012, the album was packaged with two discs of Fawlty Towers under the title BBC Comedy Greats!.

In June 2014, the album was included as bonus content with the expanded re-release of 'Monty Python Sings (again)" as a deluxe 2-CD set and digital download.

Track listing

Side one
 Flying Sheep
 Television Interviews
 Trade Description Act
 Nudge Nudge
 The Mouse Problem
 Buying a Bed
 Interesting People
 The Barber
 Interviews

Side two
 More Television Interviews
 Children's Stories
 The Visitors
 The Cinema
 The North Minehead Bye-Election (sic)
 Me, Doctor
 Pet Shop
 Self-Defence

BBC audiobook track listing
 Flying Sheep
 A Man with Three Buttocks
 Crunchy Frog
 Nudge Nudge Wink Wink
 The Mouse Problem
 Buying a Bed
 Interesting People
 Barber Shop Sketch
 Lumberjack Song
 Interview
 Arthur Two Sheds
 Children's Stories
 Visitors
 Albatross
 Mr Hilter
 The North Minehead By-Election
 Me, Doctor
 Dead Parrot Sketch
 Self-Defence

Personnel 
 Graham Chapman
 John Cleese
 Terry Gilliam
 Eric Idle
 Terry Jones
 Michael Palin

Additional performers 
 Carol Cleveland
 The Fred Tomlinson Singers

Distribution information
LP: (1970) BBC Records REB 73M (UK)
CS: (1970) BBC Records REMC 73 (UK)
LP: (1970) BBC Records 22073 (US)
LP: (1975) Pye Records 12116 (US)
CD: (1985) BBC/Audio Visual International BBCCD73 (UK)
LP: (1986) Warner Brothers Records 88375 (US)
CS: (1994) BBC Enterprises, Ltd. ZBBC 1508  (UK) (Canned Laughter series)
CD: (1996) BBC Audiobooks  (UK)
CD: (2006) BBC Audiobooks  (UK)
CD: (2011) AudioGO  (UK) (Vintage Beeb series. Facsimile Edition.)
CD: (2012) AudioGO  (UK) (BBC Comedy Greats! with Fawlty Towers.)
LP: (2014) BBC Records MPYTHONLP1 (UK) (Boxset Monty Python's Total Rubbish)

References 

Flying Circus
1970 live albums
1970 debut albums
BBC Records albums